Eugenie Schumann (1 December 1851 – 25 September 1938) was a German pianist and author.

Biography 

Eugenie Schumann was born 1 December 1851 in Düsseldorf.
She was one of eight children and the youngest daughter of Robert and Clara Schumann. Eugenie studied piano with her mother and with Ernst Rudorff in Berlin. During all of her artistic life, she stood in the shadow of her mother. 

Schumann had a romantic relationship with the singer Marie Fillunger, called "Fillu", who lived with the Schumanns for a long time after 1878. In 1888, Schumann ended the relationship, and in January 1889, Fillunger left the Schumanns' home. Both, however, continued to correspond intensively afterwards.

In October 1892, Schumann moved to England and worked there as a piano teacher. In 1918, she left England to support her aged sister, Marie, who had lived in Interlaken, Switzerland, since 1897. In 1925, Schumann published her autobiography, Erinnerungen (Memories), and in 1931, a much-noted biography of her family, titled Robert Schumann after her father, which was translated into several languages.  This second book was dedicated to her sister Marie, who had died in 1929, and her lover Marie Fillunger, who had died a year later.

Schumann died 25 September 1938 in Bern, Switzerland. She was buried next to Marie Fillunger at the Gsteig cemetery in Wilderswil near Interlaken.

Publications 
 Erinnerungen, Stuttgart: J. Engelhorns Nachfahren, 1925 – New edition with poems by Felix Schumann as: Claras Kinder, Cologne: Dittrich, 1995, 
 Robert Schumann. Ein Lebensbild meines Vaters, Leipzig: Koehler & Amelang, 1931
 Clara Schumann im Briefwechsel mit Eugenie Schumann, Vol. 1: 1857–1888, edited by Christina Siegfried (Schumann-Briefedition, Series I, Vol. 8), Cologne: Dohr 2013

References

Further reading 
 Eva Rieger (ed.), Mit 1000 Küssen Deine Fillu. Briefe der Sängerin Marie Fillunger an Eugenie Schumann 1875–93, Cologne: Dittrich, 2002, 
 Eva Rieger, "Deine Liebe hat mir erst gezeigt was leben heißt". Marie Fillunger (1850-1930) und Eugenie Schumann (1851-1938), in Joey Horsley, Luise F. Pusch (eds.), Berühmte Frauenpaare, Frankfurt: Suhrkamp, 2005, pp. 61–93 
 Beatrix Borchard: Marie und Eugenie Schumann. In Katharina Raabe (ed.): Deutsche Schwestern: Vierzehn biographische Porträts. Rowohlt, Berlin 1997, pp. 173–213
 Titus Frazeni [Alfred Schumann]: Johannes Brahms, der Vater von Felix Schumann: das Mysterium einer Liebe; eine sehr ernste Parodie auf die 'Erinnerungen' von Eugenie Schumann. With a foreword by Alfred Schumann and 6 original prints by Fritz Steinau. Manfred-Verlag, Bielefeld 1926
 Moritz von Bredow: Rebellische Pianistin. Das Leben der Grete Sultan zwischen Berlin und New York. Biography, 368 pp., 60 illustrations - Many references to Clara and Eugenie Schumann and the Hoch Conservatory in Frankfurt. Schott Music, Mainz, 2012.

External links 

Eugenie Schumann on 
Review of Mit 1000 Küssen Deine Fillu

1851 births
1938 deaths
20th-century German women writers
German women pianists
Robert Schumann
Musicians from Düsseldorf
German lesbian musicians
German lesbian writers